The 7th South Indian International Movie Awards is an awards event held at Dubai on September 14 and 15, 2018. It aims to recognize notable films and performances from the past year in Telugu, Tamil, Malayalam, and Kannada films along with special honors for lifetime contributions and a few special awards. The nomination list for the main awards was announced in June 2017.

Honorary awards 
P. Suseela (Lifetime Achievement Award)

Other Awards 

 SIIMA Award for Best Cinematographer  – K. K. Senthil Kumar (Baahubali 2: The Conclusion)

Main awards winners and nominees

Film

Acting

Debut awards 
{| class="wikitable" |
|-
! colspan="2" ! style="background:#eedd82; width:3000px; text-align:center;"|SIIMA Award for Best Debut Actor
|-
! ! style="background:#efac00; width:50%; text-align:center;"|Tamil
! ! style="background:#ef1c00; width:50%; text-align:center;"|Telugu
|-
| valign="top" |
Vasanth Ravi – Taramani
Hiphop Tamizha – Meesaya Murukku 
Vetri – 8 Thottakkal 
| valign="top" |
Ishaan – Rogue
Aashish Raj – Aakatayi
Ganta Ravi – Jayadev
Rakshit – London Babulu
Vishwak Sen – Vellipomakey
|-
! ! style="background:#00def3; text-align:center;"| Kannada
! ! style="background:#4df300; text-align:center;"| Malayalam
|-
|
Rishi – Operation Alamelamma
Ishaan – Rogue
Manoranjan – Saheba
Mithra – Raaga
Raj B. Shetty – Ondu Motteya Kathe
|
Antony Varghese – Angamaly Diaries
Amal Shah – Parava
Arjun Asokan – Parava
Askar Ali – Honey Bee 2.5
Sarath Appani – Angamaly Diaries|-
! colspan="2" ! style="background:#eedd82; text-align:center;"|SIIMA Award for Best Debut Actress
|-
! ! style="background:#efac00; text-align:center;"|Tamil
! ! style="background:#ef1c00; text-align:center;"|Telugu
|-
| valign="top" |
Aditi Rao Hydari – Kaatru VeliyidaiAditi Balan – AruviPriya Bhavani Shankar – Meyaadha MaanSayyeshaa Saigal – VanamaganShraddha Srinath – Vikram Vedha| valign="top" |
Kalyani Priyadarshan – HelloAakanksha Singh – Malli RaavaMegha Akash – LIE 
Nivetha Pethuraj – Mental MadhiloShalini Pandey – Arjun Reddy|-
! ! style="background:#00def3; text-align:center;"| Kannada
! ! style="background:#4df300; text-align:center;"| Malayalam
|-
|
Ekta Rathod – Siliconn CityAditi Prabhudeva – Dhairyam 
Divya Uruduga – HuliraayaKavitha Gowda – Srinivasa KalyanaVaibhavi Shandilya – Raj Vishnu|
Nimisha Sajayan – 'Thondimuthalum Driksakshiyum'
Aishwarya Lekshmi – Njandukalude Nattil OridavelaReshma Anna Rajan  – Angamaly DiariesSanthy Balachandran – Tharangam 
Wamiqa Gabbi – Godha|-
! colspan="2" ! style="background:#eedd82; text-align:center;"|SIIMA Award for Best Debut Director
|-
! ! style="background:#efac00; text-align:center;"|Tamil
! ! style="background:#ef1c00; text-align:center;"|Telugu
|-
| valign="top" |
Arun Prabhu Purushothaman – AruviDhanush – Pa PaandiGopi Nainar – ArammLokesh Kanagaraj – MaanagaramRajkumar Periaswamy – Rangoon| valign="top" |
Sandeep Vanga – Arjun Reddy 
Mahi V. Raghav – Anando BrahmaPrabhakar Podakandla – Next Nuvve 
Sankalp Reddy – GhaziVivek Athreya – Mental Madhilo|-
! ! style="background:#00def3; text-align:center;"| Kannada
! ! style="background:#4df300; text-align:center;"| Malayalam
|-
|
Tharun Sudhir – ChowkaAdarsh Eshwarappa – ShuddhiPannaga Bharana – Happy New Year 
Raj B. Shetty – Ondu Motteya KatheRavi Basrur – Kataka| 
Mahesh Narayan – Take OffArun Gopy – RamaleelaHaneef Adeni – The Great FatherJay K – EzraSoubin Shahir – Parava|}

 Music 

Critics' choice
Kollywood

Best Actor – R. Madhavan – Vikram Vedha
Best Actress – Aditi Balan – AruviTollywood
Best Actor – Venkatesh and Nandamuri Balakrishna  – Guru and Gautamiputra Satakarni 
Best Actress – Ritika Singh  – Guru 
Kannada Cinema
Best Actor – Sri Murali
Best Actress – Sruthi Hariharan
Malayalam Cinema
Best Actor – Fahadh Faasil
Best Actress – Aishwarya Lekshmi
Special Award 
Best Child Artist – Shlaga Saligrama – Kataka

Generation Next Awards
Entertainer of the Year
 Rana Daggubati – Baahubali 2: The Conclusion / Ghazi / Nene Raju Nene Mantri''
Style icon of the year – Hansika Motwani

References

External links
 Official website

South Indian International Movie Awards
2018 Indian film awards